Alyn and Deeside is a constituency of the Senedd. It elects one Member of the Senedd by the first past the post method of election. Also, however, it is one of nine constituencies in the North Wales electoral region, which elects four additional members, in addition to nine constituency members, to produce a degree of proportional representation for the region as a whole.

The constituency has been represented by Jack Sargeant since February 2018.

Boundaries

The constituency was created for the first election to the Assembly, in 1999, with the name and boundaries of the Alyn and Deeside Westminster constituency. It is entirely within the preserved county of Clwyd. For the 2007 Assembly election, there were minor changes to the constituency's boundaries. For Westminster purposes, the same boundary changes became effective at the 2010 United Kingdom general election.

When created in 1999, the North Wales region included the constituencies of Alyn and Deeside, Caernarfon, Clwyd West, Clwyd South, Conwy, Delyn, Vale of Clwyd, Wrexham and Ynys Môn (Anglesey).

Since the 2007 election, the region includes Aberconwy, Alyn and Deeside, Arfon, Clwyd South, Clwyd West, Delyn, Vale of Clwyd, Wrexham and Ynys Môn (Anglesey).

History
The constituency has been held by Labour since its creation. The assembly member Carl Sargeant served as Cabinet Secretary for Communities and Children from 19 May 2016 until his resignation on 3 November 2017 following his suspension from the Labour Party due to "shocking and distressing" allegations about his personal behaviour. The seat was vacant following his death by suicide on 7 November 2017 and remained vacant until the by-election in the constituency took place on 6 February 2018, which was won by Carl's son Jack Sargeant for the Labour Party.

Voting
In general elections for the Senedd, each voter has two votes. The first vote may be used to vote for a candidate to become the Member of the Senedd for the voter's constituency, elected by the first past the post system. The second vote may be used to vote for a regional closed party list of candidates. Additional member seats are allocated from the lists by the d'Hondt method, with constituency results being taken into account in the allocation.

Assembly Members and Members of the Senedd

Elections

Elections in the 2020s

Elections in the 2010s
A by-election took place on 6 February 2018, following the death of incumbent AM Carl Sargeant.

Regional ballots rejected: 226

Elections in the 2000s

2003 Electorate: 60,518
Regional ballots rejected: 120

Elections in the 1990s

Notes

See also
 North Wales (Senedd Cymru electoral region)
 Senedd constituencies and electoral regions

Senedd constituencies in the North Wales electoral region
1999 establishments in Wales
Constituencies established in 1999